Petrushonki is the name of several rural localities in Russia.

Modern localities
Petrushonki, Perm Krai, a village in Sivinsky District of Perm Krai
Petrushonki, Pskov Oblast, a village in Pytalovsky District of Pskov Oblast

Abolished localities
Petrushonki, Kostroma Oblast, a village in Semenovsky Selsoviet of Vokhomsky District of Kostroma Oblast; abolished on October 6, 2004

References

Notes

Sources